Warren Stormes Hale (22 July 1862 – 5 February 1934) was an English cricketer.  Hale's batting style is unknown.  He was born at Bures, Suffolk.

Hale made his first-class debut for Middlesex against Sussex in the 1893 County Championship.  He made three further first-class appearances for the county in that season's County Championship, the last of which came against Lancashire.  In his four first-class appearances for the county, he scored a total of 77 runs at an average of 12.83, with a high score of 36.  He also made a single first-class appearance for the Marylebone Cricket Club against the Gentlemen of Philadelphia in 1897.

He died at Highgate, Middlesex, on 5 February 1934.

References

External links
Warren Hale at ESPNcricinfo
Warren Hale at CricketArchive

1862 births
1934 deaths
People from Babergh District
English cricketers
Middlesex cricketers
Marylebone Cricket Club cricketers
People from Highgate